A skinner is a person who skins animals such as cattle, sheep, and pigs, part or whole.  Historically, skinners engaged in the hide and fur trades.

"Mule skinner" (or "muleskinner") is slang for muleteer, a driver or wrangler of mules.

See also
Worshipful Company of Skinners

References

Meat industry
Artisans